Fresh Prince may refer to:

The Fresh Prince, part of the rap duo DJ Jazzy Jeff & The Fresh Prince composed of the rapper/actor Will Smith and DJ Jazzy Jeff
Will Smith, known as Fresh Prince 
The Fresh Prince of Bel-Air, a TV series featuring Fresh Prince played by Will Smith
"Fresh Prince" (song), a song by French rapper Soprano featuring Uncle Phil